Maria Antonina is a feminine blended given name from the root names Miriam and Antonius. Notable people referred to by this name include the following:

Given name
Maria Antonina Kratochwil (1881–1942), Austro-Hungarian beatified martyr
Maria Antonina Boniecka, known as Maria Boniecka, (1910–1978), Polish author and teacher
Maria Antonina Czaplicka, known as Maria Czaplicka, (1884–1921), Polish cultural anthropologist

See also

Maria Antonia
María Antonieta
María Antonietta
Marie Antoinette (name)

Notes

French feminine given names
Polish feminine given names